Childhood cancer is cancer in a child. About 80% of childhood cancer cases can be successfully treated thanks to modern medical treatments and optimal patient care. However, only about 10% of children diagnosed with cancer reside in high-income countries where the necessary treatments and care is available. Childhood cancer represents only about 1% of all types of cancers diagnosed in children and adults. For this reason, childhood cancer is often ignored in control planning, contributing to the burden of missed opportunities for its diagnoses and management in countries that are low- and mid-income.

In the United States, an arbitrarily adopted standard of the ages used are 0–14 years inclusive, that is, up to 14 years 11.9 months of age. However, the definition of childhood cancer sometimes includes adolescents between 15 and 19 years old. Pediatric oncology is the branch of medicine concerned with the diagnosis and treatment of cancer in children.

Signs and symptoms

Leukemia 
This is the most common type of cancer during childhood, and acute lymphoblastic leukemia (ALL) is most common in children. ALL usually develops in children between the ages of 1 to 10 (it could occur at any age). This type of cancer is more prevalent in males and in whites.

Signs & Symptoms:

Frequent delayed diagnosis (early symptoms are nonspecific)

 Generalized malaise
 Loss of appetite
 Low-grade fever
 Pallor
 Petechiae  
 Ecchymoses
 Bone pain
 Significant, unintended, and sudden weight loss

Physical examination:

 Significant lymphadenopathy
 Hepatosplenomegaly should raise suspicion for leukemia.

Important: It is recommended that a complete blood count is obtained (CBC) if any suspicious finding arise.

Central nervous system tumors 
This is the second most common malignancy diagnosed during childhood.

Signs and Symptoms

 Ataxia
 Other gait disturbances (hydrocephalus due to aqueduct compression)
 Cranial nerve abnormalities as a result of brainstem compression

Hodgkin's disease 
The likelihood of developing Hodgkin's disease increases during childhood and it peaks in adolescence.  

Signs and Symptoms

 Painless mass in the neck
 Persistent cough secondary to a mediastinal mass 
 Less commonly: splenomegaly or enlarged axillary or inguinal lymph nodes
 Intermittent fever
 Drenching night sweats
 Loss of greater than 10 percent of total body weight.
 Anorexia
 Fatigue
 Pruritus
 Persistent painless mass

Non-Hodgkin's lymphoma 
This type of cancer is more common in older children, and it is less prevalent than Hodgkin's disease.

Signs and Symptoms

If abdomen is affected

 Abdominal pain
 Vomiting or diarrhea
 Palpable mass and intussusception

If mediastinum is affected

 Severe dyspnea
 Superior vena cava syndrome

If head and neck masses are affected

 Palpable mass
 Cranial nerve palsies
 Nasal obstruction

Neuroblastoma 
This cancer is an extracranial solid tumor commonly diagnosed in childhood.  

Signs and Symptoms

 Dysfunction of the location of the primary tumor 
 Anorexia
 Abdominal pain
 Distention.

Wilms' tumor 
This malignancy presents as an abdominal mass in a child.

Signs and Symptoms

 Abdominal pain
 Gross hematuria
 Hypertension
 Fever.

Malignancies of the musculoskeletal system 
A tumor that arises in the musculoskeletal system often presents as a mass, a painful extremity or, occasionally, a pathologic fracture.

Signs and Symptoms

 Pain awakens a child at night
 Significant extremity dysfunction (when trauma is not involved)

Genetic syndromes associated with cancer 
The cause of cancer is not yet well understood. Several chromosomal disorders and constitutional syndromes are associated with it.

Learning problems 
Children with cancer are at risk for developing various cognitive or learning problems. These difficulties may be related to brain injury stemming from the cancer itself, such as a brain tumor or central nervous system metastasis or from side effects of cancer treatments such as chemotherapy and radiation therapy.  Studies have shown that chemo and radiation therapies may damage brain white matter and disrupt brain activity.

This cognitive problem is known as post-chemotherapy cognitive impairment (PCCI) or "chemo brain." This term is commonly use by cancer survivors who describe having thinking and memory problems after cancer treatment. Researchers are unsure what exactly causes chemo brain, however, they say it is likely to be linked to either the cancer itself, the cancer treatment, or be an emotional reaction to both.

This cognitive impairment is commonly noticed a few years after a child endures cancer treatment. When a childhood cancer survivor goes back to school, they might experience lower test scores, problems with memory, attention, and behavior, as well as poor hand-eye coordination and slowed development over time. Children with cancer should be monitored and assessed for these neuropsychological deficits during and after treatment. Patients with brain tumors can have cognitive impairments before treatment  and radiation therapy is associated with increased risk of cognitive impairment. Parents can apply their children for special educational services at school if their cognitive learning disability affects their educational success.

Risk factors 

Risk factors are any genetic or environmental exposure that increase the chances of developing a pathological condition. Some examples are age, family history, environmental factors, genetics, and economic status among others.

Demographic risk factors 
 Childhood cancer varies by age, sex, ethnicity, and race. Its' incidence peaks in infancy with about 240 cases/million/year. 
 This rate decreases to 128 cases per million from 5–9 years of age, and it rises again to 220 cases/million.
 Slight male dominance for most childhood cancers.

Environmental factors 
 High dose ionizing radiation and prior chemotherapy are accepted causes of childhood cancer, each raising risk several fold (4-7).

Genetic factors 
Identified Cancer Predisposition Syndromes

 Li-Fraumeni syndrome (TP53)
 Hereditary breast or ovarian cancer (BRCA )
 Colorectal cancer/polyposis syndromes
 Familial retinoblastoma (RB1)
 Familial and genetic factors are identified in 5-15% of childhood cancer cases. In <5-10% of cases, there are known environmental exposures and exogenous factors, such as prenatal exposure to tobacco, X-rays, or certain medications. For the remaining 75-90% of cases, however, the individual causes remain unknown. In most cases, as in carcinogenesis in general, the cancers are assumed to involve multiple risk factors and variables.

Aspects that make the risk factors of childhood cancer different from those seen in adult cancers include:
Different, and sometimes unique, exposures to environmental hazards. Children must often rely on adults to protect them from toxic environmental agents.
Immature physiological systems to clear or metabolize environmental substances
The growth and development of children in phases known as "developmental windows" result in certain "critical windows of vulnerability".
Also, a longer life expectancy in children avails for a longer time to manifest cancer processes with long latency periods, increasing the risk of developing some cancer types later in life.

Advanced parental age has been associated with increased risk of childhood cancer in the offspring. There are preventable causes of childhood malignancy, such as delivery overuse and misuse of ionizing radiation through computed tomography scans when the test is not indicated or when adult protocols are used.

Diagnosis

Types 
The most common cancers in children are (childhood) leukemia (32%), brain tumors (18%), and lymphomas (11%). In 2005, 4.1 of every 100,000 young people under 20 years of age in the U.S. were diagnosed with leukemia, and 0.8 per 100,000 died from it. The number of new cases was highest among the 1–4 age group, but the number of deaths was highest among the 10–14 age group.

In 2005, 2.9 of every 100,000 people 0–19 years of age were found to have cancer of the brain or central nervous system, and 0.7 per 100,000 died from it. These cancers were found most often in children between 1 and 4 years of age, but the most deaths occurred among those aged 5–9. The main subtypes of brain and central nervous system tumors in children are: astrocytoma, brain stem glioma, craniopharyngioma, desmoplastic infantile ganglioglioma, ependymoma, high-grade glioma, medulloblastoma and atypical teratoid rhabdoid tumor.

Other, less common childhood cancer types are:
Neuroblastoma (6%, nervous system)
Wilms tumor (5%, kidney)
Non-Hodgkin lymphoma (4%, blood)
Childhood rhabdomyosarcoma (3%, many sites)
Retinoblastoma (3%, eye)
Osteosarcoma (3%, bone cancer)
Ewing sarcoma (1%, many sites)
Germ cell tumors (5%, many sites)
Pleuropulmonary blastoma (lung or pleural cavity)
Hepatoblastoma and hepatocellular carcinoma (liver cancer)

Medical specialties 
Overall, treating childhood cancer requires a multidisciplinary team of doctors, nurses, social workers, therapists, and other members of the community. Here is a brief list of doctors that can treat childhood cancer:
Pediatric oncologist: These doctors specialize in treating childhood cancers.
Pediatric hematology-oncologist: These doctors specialize in treating blood diseases in children.
Pediatric surgeon: These doctors specialize in performing surgery on children.
Adolescent and young adult oncology (AYA): AYA is a branch of medicine that deals with the prevention, diagnosis, and treatment of cancer in adolescents and young adults, often defined as those aged 13–30. Studies have continuously shown that while pediatric cancer survival rates have gone up, the survival rate for adolescents and young adults has remained stagnant. Additionally, AYA helps patients with college concerns, fertility, and sense of aloneness. Studies have often shown that treating young adults with the same protocols used in pediatrics is more effective than adult-oriented treatments.

Other specialties that can assist in the treatment process include radiology, neurosurgery, orthopedic surgery, psychiatry, and endocrinology.

Treatment 
Childhood cancer treatment is individualized and varies based on the severity & type of cancer. In general, treatment can include surgical resection, chemotherapy, radiation therapy, or immunotherapy.

Recent medical advances have improved our understanding of the genetic basis of childhood cancers. Treatment options are expanding, and precision medicine for childhood cancers is a rapidly growing area of research.

The side effects of chemotherapy can result in immediate and long-term treatment-related comorbidities. For children undergoing treatment for high-risk cancer, more than 80% experience life-threatening or fatal toxicity as a result of their treatment.

Psychosocial care of children with cancer is also important during the cancer journey, but the implementation of evidence-based interventions need to be further spread across pediatric cancer centers. In general, psychosocial care can include therapy with a psychologist or psychiatrist, referral to a social worker, or referral to a pastoral counselor. Family-centered psychosocial care is one approach that can be used to not only support the patient's psychosocial well-being but also support the parents and any caregivers of the patient.

Prognosis 
With the advancement of new treatments for childhood cancer, 85% of individuals who had childhood cancer now survive 5 years or more. This is an increase from the mid-1970s where only 58% of children with childhood cancer survived 5 years or more. However, this survival rate is dependent on many factors such as the type of cancer, age of onset, location of the cancer, cancer stage, and if there is any genetic component to the cancer. Survival rate is also impacted by socioeconomic status and access to resources during treatment.

Since adult survivors of childhood cancer are living longer, these individuals may experience long-term complications that are associated with their cancer treatment. This can include problems with organ function, growth and development, neurocognitive function and academic achievement, and risk for additional cancers.

Premature heart disease is one example of a major long-term consequence seen in adult survivors of childhood cancer. These individuals are eight times more likely to die of heart disease than other people, and more than half of the children treated for cancer develop some type of cardiac abnormality, although this may be asymptomatic or too mild to qualify for a clinical diagnosis of heart disease.

Childhood cancer survivors are also at risk of sustaining adverse effects on the kidneys  and the liver. Specific cancer treatments such as cisplatin, carboplatin, and radiotherapy are known to cause kidney damage. The risk of liver damage is increased in those who have had radiotherapy to the liver and in those with other risk factors, such as a higher body mass index or chronic viral hepatitis. Certain treatments and liver surgery may also increase the risk of adverse liver effects in childhood cancer survivors.

To help monitor for these long-term consequences, a set of guidelines have been created to facilitate long term follow up for childhood, adolescent, and young adult cancer survivors. This provides guidance for healthcare professionals on how to provide high quality follow-up care and appropriate monitoring. These guidelines also help healthcare providers collaborate with oncology specialists, in order to create recommendations specific to an individual patient.

Epidemiology 
Epidemiology is the study of the distribution and determinants of disease frequency in the human population and the study of how to control health problems. Internationally, the greatest variation in childhood cancer incidence occurs when comparing high-income countries to low-income ones. This may result from differences in being able to diagnose cancer, differences in risk among different ethnic or racial population subgroups, as well as differences in risk factors. An example of differing risk factors is in cases of pediatric Burkitt lymphoma, a form of non-Hodgkin lymphoma that sickens 6 to 7 children out of every 100,000 annually in parts of sub-Saharan Africa, where it is associated with a history of infection by both Epstein-Barr virus and malaria. In industrialized countries, Burkitt lymphoma is not associated with these infectious diseases. Non-Hispanic white children often have a better chance of survival compared to other racial and ethnic groups. Where an individual lives is one of the biggest determinants of health in the world, as illness and healthcare options can vary by an individual's postal code.

United States 
In the United States, cancer is the second most common cause of death among children between the ages of 1 and 14 years, exceeded only by unintentional injuries such as injuries sustained in a car wreck. More than 16 out of every 100,000 children and teens in the U.S. were diagnosed with cancer, and nearly 3 of every 100,000 died from the disease. In the United States in 2012, it was estimated that there was an incidence of 12,000 new cases, and 1,300 deaths, from cancer among children 0 to 14 years of age. Cancer is the second leading cause of death in males and fourth in women under the age of 20 in the United States. The survival rate of children with cancer has improved since the late 1960s which is due to improved treatment and public health measures. The estimated proportion surviving 5 years from diagnosis increased from 77.8 percent to 82.7 percent to 85.4 percent for those diagnosed in the 1990s, 2000s, and 2010–2016.

Statistics from the 2014 American Cancer Society report:

Note: Incidence and mortality rates are per 1,000,000 and age-adjusted to the 2000 US standard population. Observed survival percentage is based on data from 2003-2009.

Sub-Saharan Africa 
A large number of children in Africa live in low- and middle-income countries where there is limited access to prevention or treatment of cancer. The under-five mortality rate (U5MR), a robust indicator of child health, is at 109 per 1,000 live births. The proportion of childhood cancer is higher in Africa than in developed countries, at 4.8%. Kids with cancer are disadvantaged compared to kids in developed countries; therefore their statistic for childhood cancer is higher. In sub-Saharan Africa, 10% of children die before their 5th birthday, yet it is not due to cancer; communicable diseases such as malaria, cholera, and other infections are the leading cause of death. Children with cancer are often exposed to these preventable infections and diseases. Tumor registries only cover 11% of the African population, and there is a significant absence in death registration, making the mortality database unreliable. Overall, there is a lack of reliable data, as there is limited funding and many diseases are largely unknown to this population.

United Kingdom 
Cancer in children is rare in the UK, with an average of 1,800 diagnoses every year but contributing to less than 1% of all cancer-related deaths. Age is not a confounding factor in mortality from the disease in the UK. From 2014 to 2016, approximately 230 children died from cancer, with brain/CNS cancers being the most commonly fatal type.

Foundations and fundraising 

Currently, there are various organizations whose main focus is fighting childhood cancer. Organizations focused on childhood cancer through cancer research and/or support programs include: Childhood Cancer Canada, Young Lives vs Cancer and the Children's Cancer and Leukaemia Group (in United Kingdom), Child Cancer Foundation (in New Zealand), Children's Cancer Recovery Foundation (in United States), American Childhood Cancer Organization (in United States), Childhood Cancer Support (Australia) and the Hayim Association (in Israel). Alex's Lemonade Stand Foundation allows people across the US to raise money for pediatric cancer research by organizing lemonade stands. The National Pediatric Cancer Foundation focuses on finding less toxic and more effective treatments for pediatric cancers. This foundation works with 24 different hospitals across the US in search of treatments effective in practice. Childhood Cancer International is the largest global pediatric cancer foundation. It focuses on early access to care for childhood cancers, focusing on patient support and patient advocacy.

According to estimates by experts in the field of pediatric cancer, by 2020, cancer will cost $158 million annually for both research and treatment which marks a 27% increase since 2010. Ways in which the foundations are helped by people include writing checks, collecting spare coins, bake/lemonade sales, donating portions of purchases from stores or restaurants, or Paid Time Off donations as well as auctions, bike rides, dance-a-thons. Additionally, many of the major foundations have donation buttons on their respective websites.

In addition to advancing research focusing on cancer, the foundations also offer support to families whose children are affected by the disease. The estimated total cost for one child with cancer (medical costs and lost parental wages) is $833,000. Organizations such as the National Children's Cancer Society and the Leukemia and Lymphoma Society can provide financial assistance for the costs associated with childhood cancer like medical care, home care, child care, and transportation.

Importance of family support 
The emotional challenges that a parent may encounter can disrupt their child's treatment, parenting and support for the child who is ill and their siblings, and impact overall family stability. Therefore, having a support network during this time is important. Different foundations fund support groups within hospitals and online for parents and families to aid in the coping process. Targeted support for siblings of children with cancer is also warranted. Resources that account for family context, age, and gender can help siblings process cancer-related emotional reactions. These targeted resources help promote family activities and normal family functioning, while enhancing family adjustment over time.

The foundations for pediatric cancer all fall under the 501(c)3 designation which means that they are non-profit organizations that are tax-exempt. The "International Childhood Cancer Day" occurs annually on February 15.

References 

Pediatric cancers